Tullnerbach is a municipality in the district of St. Pölten-Land in the Austrian state of Lower Austria. It was here in 1901 that Wilhelm Kress failed at his attempt of motorized seaplane flight on the Wienerwaldsee. The town belonged to Wien-Umgebung which was dissolved in 2016.

Population

References

Cities and towns in St. Pölten-Land District
Cadastral community of St. Pölten District